Novosilske may refer to the following places in Ukraine:

 Novosilske, Crimea, village in Chornomorske Raion
 Novosilske, Odessa Oblast, village in Reni Raion
 Novosilske, Sumy Oblast, village in Lebedyn Raion
 Novosilske, Zaporizhia Oblast, village in Berdiansk Raion